Khawaja Shahabuddin (31 May 1898 – 9 February 1977) was a politician of Kashmiri-Bengali descent from East Pakistan who was a minister in the Government of Pakistan and member of the Dhaka Nawab family. He was the younger brother of Khawaja Nazimuddin and the father of Bangladeshi Lieutenant-General Khwaja Wasiuddin.

Early life
Khawaja Shahabuddin was born on 31 May 1898. His father was Khwaja Nizamuddin, who was a zamindar.

He served as the municipality commissioner of Dhaka from 1918 to 1921. In 1921 he joined the Dhaka district board. He became the chairman of the board in 1923 to 1924. From 1928 to 1944 he was the president of Dhaka district Muslim League.

Career
In 1936 he was a member of the executive council of the Governor of Bengal Presidency. From 1930 to 1938 he was the treasurer at the University of Dhaka. He was elected to the Bengal legislative assembly from Narayanganj in 1937. He was the Chief Whip in the A K Fazlul Haq government in Bengal from 1937 to 1941. He was the Minister of Commerce, Labour and Industry in Khwaja Nazimuddin’s government from 1943 to 1945.

Shahabuddin was also involved in the movement for the creation of Pakistan. In 1947 he became the Chief whip in National Assembly of Pakistan. In 1948, he became the Minister of Home Affairs, Information and Broadcasting in the cabinet of Liaquat Ali Khan. In 1951, he was appointed Governor of the North West Frontier Province. He also the Ambassador of Pakistan to Saudi Arabia and Yemen in 1954, Egypt in 1958, Nigeria, Cameroon, Senegal, Togo and Sierra Leone from 1961 to 1964. He served as the Minister of Information and Broadcasting from 1965 to 1969 under the administration of Ayub Khan.

Death
He died on 9 February 1977 in Karachi, Pakistan.

References

1898 births
1977 deaths
Interior ministers of Pakistan
Governors of Khyber Pakhtunkhwa
Members of the Dhaka Nawab family
People of East Pakistan
Pakistani MNAs 1947–1954
Ambassadors of Pakistan to Saudi Arabia
Ambassadors of Pakistan to Yemen
Ambassadors of Pakistan to Egypt
High Commissioners of Pakistan to Nigeria
High Commissioners of Pakistan to Cameroon
Ambassadors of Pakistan to Senegal
Ambassadors of Pakistan to Togo
High Commissioners of Pakistan to Sierra Leone
Bengal MLAs 1937–1945
Members of the Constituent Assembly of Pakistan